Imanuel Rumbiak (born November 26, 1998) is an Indonesian professional footballer who plays as a full-back for Liga 2 club Persewar Waropen.

Club career

Barito Putera
In 2019, Rumbiak signed a contract with Indonesian Liga 1 club Barito Putera.

Persipura Jayapura
He was signed for Persipura Jayapura to play in Liga 1 in the 2020 season. This season was suspended on 27 March 2020 due to the COVID-19 pandemic. The season was abandoned and was declared void on 20 January 2021.

References

External links
 Imanuel Rumbiak at Soccerway
 Imanuel Rumbiak at Liga Indonesia

1998 births
Living people
Indonesian footballers
Persipura Jayapura players
Association football fullbacks
People from Mimika Regency
Sportspeople from Papua